Uchkun is a village in Naryn Region of Kyrgyzstan. Its population was 3,000 in 2021.

References
 

 

Populated places in Naryn Region